The Dust Bowl Symphony is an album released by Nanci Griffith in 1999. It consists of songs Griffith had previously released on other albums, but re-recorded with an orchestral backing. The album was recorded at Abbey Road Studios with the London Symphony Orchestra. Darius Rucker duets with Griffith on "Love at The Five and Dime", and the album also has contributions from Sonny Curtis and Glen Hardin, Beth Nielsen Chapman and Griffith's own band, The Blue Moon Orchestra. The song "Waiting for Love", written by Griffith, from Blue Roses from the Moons was picked out by Griffith as giving the singer a "brief moment of being Edith Piaf".

Track listing
All tracks composed by Nanci Griffith except where indicated.
"Trouble in the Fields" 4:36    
"The Wing and the Wheel" 4:56    
"These Days in an Open Book" 3:30    
"Love at the Five and Dime" 4:53 
"It's a Hard Life (Wherever You Go)" 4:20   
"Late Night Grande Hotel" 2:48   
"Tell Me How"  (Buddy Holly, J.I.Allison) 3:02    
"Not My Way Home" 4:27
"1937 Pre-War Kimball" 4:10   
"Waiting For Love" 3:35    
"Nobody's Angel" 3:50    
"Always Will" 2:52    
"Drops From The Faucet" (Frank Christian) 3:51
"Dust Bowl Reprise" (James Hooker, Michael Hanna) 2:19

Personnel
 Nanci Griffith - lead vocals, harmony vocals, guitar
 Frank Christian - acoustic guitar
 Andrew Pryce Jackman - conductor
 Pat McInerney - drums, percussion
 Ron De La Vega - electric bass guitar, acoustic bass guitar
 Doug Lancio - electric guitar, acoustic guitar, resonator guitar
 John Mock - acoustic guitar, whistle
 John Catchings - cello
 Jennifer Kimball - harmony vocals
 Le Ann Etheridge - harmony vocals
 Lee Satterfield - guitar, mandolin, harmony vocals
 James Hooker - keyboards

References

Nanci Griffith albums
1999 albums
Albums produced by Peter Collins (record producer)
Elektra Records albums